Christian Wilkins (born December 20, 1995) is an American football defensive end for the Miami Dolphins of National Football League (NFL). He played college football at Clemson and was drafted by the Dolphins in the first round of the 2019 NFL Draft.

Early years
Wilkins is a native of Springfield, Massachusetts. He originally attended Framingham High School, before transferring to Suffield Academy in Suffield, Connecticut after his freshman year. In 35 games in high school he had 253 tackles and 28.5 sacks. Wilkins was rated as a five-star recruit and was ranked among the top players in his class. He committed to play college football at Clemson University.

College career
As a freshman at Clemson in 2015, Wilkins played in 15 games with one start and had 33 tackles and two sacks. As a sophomore in 2016, he was named an All-American by the Football Writers Association of America (FWAA) and was a finalist for the Bronko Nagurski Trophy. Wilkins was part of the Clemson team that defeated top-ranked Alabama in the 2017 College Football Playoff National Championship by a score of 35–31. He also was part of Clemson’s 2018 team that defeated Alabama in the National Championship game lead by Trevor Lawrence 44-16.  In the Florida State game and South Carolina game of 2018, Wilkins scored a touchdown for the Tigers.

College statistics

Professional career

2019
Wilkins was drafted by the Miami Dolphins in the first round (13th overall) of the 2019 NFL Draft. In a Week 7 21-31 loss to the Buffalo Bills, Wilkins was ejected after throwing a punch at Cody Ford on the second play of the game. In Week 9 against the New York Jets, Wilkins recorded his first career sack on Sam Darnold in the 26–18 win. In Week 16 against the Cincinnati Bengals, Wilkins recorded his first career touchdown reception on a pass from Ryan Fitzpatrick in the 38–35 overtime victory.

2020
In Week 8 against the Los Angeles Rams, Wilkins recorded his first career interception off a pass thrown by Jared Goff during the 28–17 win. Wilkins was placed on the reserve/COVID-19 list by the team on November 12, 2020, and activated on November 25.

2021
In week 15 against the New York Jets, Wilkins lined up at fullback and recorded his second career touchdown on a flick pass from quarterback Tua Tagovailoa.

2022
The Dolphins picked up the fifth-year option on Wilkins' contract on April 28, 2022.

References

Further reading

External links
 Sports Reference (college)

Miami Dolphins bio
Clemson Tigers bio

1995 births
All-American college football players
American football defensive ends
American football defensive tackles
Clemson Tigers football players
Framingham High School alumni
Living people
Miami Dolphins players
Players of American football from Massachusetts
Sportspeople from Springfield, Massachusetts